František Hoplíček (23 April 1890 – 13 April 1946) was a Czech painter and athlete. He competed in the men's discus throw at the 1920 Summer Olympics. He also competed in the art competition at the 1932 Summer Olympics.

References

External links
 

1890 births
1946 deaths
Athletes (track and field) at the 1920 Summer Olympics
Czech male discus throwers
20th-century Czech male artists
Olympic athletes of Czechoslovakia
People from Šumperk District
Olympic competitors in art competitions
Czech painters
Sportspeople from the Olomouc Region